The Abbot House, also known as the Abbot-Spalding House, is a historic house museum at One Abbot Square in Nashua, New Hampshire. Built in 1804, it is one of the area's most prominent examples of Federal period architecture, albeit with substantial early 20th-century Colonial Revival alterations. The house was listed on the National Register of Historic Places in 1980, and the New Hampshire State Register of Historic Places in 2002. It is now owned by the Nashua Historical Society, which operates it as a museum; it is open by appointment.

Description and history
Abbot Square is a triangular green just north of downtown Nashua, bounded by Amherst Street, Concord Street, and Nashville Street. The Abbot House stands on the north side of Nashville Street, facing south. It is a two-story wood-frame house with brick side walls, a locally rare feature. It is covered by a truncated hip roof, with a low balustrade around the outer edge. The front facade is five bays wide, with windows symmetrically placed around a slightly wider central bay. The main entrance is in the center, sheltered by a rectangular portico supported by four large fluted columns and topped by a balustrade.

The house was built in 1804 for Daniel Abbot, a prominent local resident. It was owned 1854–1892 by George Perham, under whose ownership the exterior was given an extensive Victorian treatment, which included a three-story tower in the central bay. Purchased in 1905 by William Spaulding, he removed most of the Victorian alterations, while adding Colonial Revival features, including the present portico. The house was given to the Nashua Historical Society by his descendants.

See also
National Register of Historic Places listings in Hillsborough County, New Hampshire
New Hampshire Historical Marker No. 267: Abbot-Spalding House

References

External links

 Abbot-Spalding House Museum - Nashua Historical Society

Houses on the National Register of Historic Places in New Hampshire
Federal architecture in New Hampshire
Greek Revival houses in New Hampshire
Houses completed in 1804
Buildings and structures in Nashua, New Hampshire
Historic house museums in New Hampshire
Historic district contributing properties in New Hampshire
Houses in Hillsborough County, New Hampshire
Museums in Hillsborough County, New Hampshire
National Register of Historic Places in Hillsborough County, New Hampshire
New Hampshire State Register of Historic Places